Whippleville is a hamlet in Franklin County, New York, United States. Whippleville had a post office from May 26, 1887, until October 14, 1989; it still has its own ZIP code, 12995.

References

Hamlets in Franklin County, New York
Hamlets in New York (state)